Yeşilköy (formerly San Stefano) is a neighbourhood in Bakırköy district of Istanbul, Turkey.

Yeşilköy (literally "green village" in Turkish) may also refer to:

 Yeşilköy, Akçakoca
 Yeşilköy, Bayramiç
 Yeşilköy, Biga
 Yeşilköy, Bolu, a village in Bolu district of Bolu Province, Turkey
 Yeşilköy, Borçka, a village in Borçka district of Artvin Province, Turkey
 Yeşilköy, Çine, a village in Çine district of Aydın Province, Turkey 
 Yeşilköy, Ergani
 Yeşilköy, Finike, a village in Finike district of Antalya Province, Turkey 
 Yeşilköy, Hatay, a town in Dörtyol district of Hatay Province, Turkey 
 Yeşilköy, Haymana, a village in Haymana district of Ankara Province, Turkey  
 Yeşilköy, Hopa, a village in Hopa district of Artvin Province, Turkey 
 Yeşilköy, İvrindi, a village in Balıkesir Province, Turkey
 Yeşilköy, Karacasu, a village in Karacasu district of Aydın Province, Turkey
 Yeşilköy, Kargı
 Yeşilköy, Kaş, a village in Kaş district of Antalya Province, Turkey
 Yeşilköy, Keşan
 Yeşilköy, Kızılcahamam, a village in tKızılcahamam district of Ankara Province, Turkey 
 Yeşilköy, Kovancılar
 Yeşilköy, Kumluca, a village in Kumluca district of Antalya Province, Turkey  
 Yeşilköy, Mut, a village in Mut district of Mersin Province, Turkey
 Yeşilköy, Silvan
 Yeşilköy, Sivrihisar, a village in Sivrihisar district of Eskişehir Province, Turkey 
 Yeşilköy, Söke, a village in Söke district of Aydın Province, Turkey 
 Yeşilköy, Tavas
 Yeşilköy, Yenice
 Yeşilköy, Yumurtalık, a village in Yumurtalık district of Adana Province, Turkey 
 Agios Andronikos (Yeşilköy), a village in northern Cyprus

Other uses 
 Yeşilköy Feneri, a lighthouse in Yeşilköy, Istanbul
 Yeşilköy International Airport, former name of Atatürk International Airport in Istanbul